State Road 666 (SR 666) is a short state road in Pinellas County. Locally known as Tom Stuart Causeway, Welch Causeway, or Madeira Beach Causeway, the route crosses Boca Ciega Bay from Seminole to Madeira Beach. The bridge crossing Boca Ciega Bay is a bascule bridge with 11 spans, built in 1962. The route ends with an interchange with U.S. Route 19 Alternate  (US 19 Alt.) in Bay Pines (originally built for the formerly proposed Pinellas Belt Expressway). The southwestern terminus of the route is at State Road 699 in Madeira Beach, in front of the Ocean Sands hotel.

Major intersections

See also 
 Dunedin Causeway
 Clearwater Memorial Causeway
 Sand Key Bridge
 Belleair Causeway
 Indian Rocks Causeway
 Park Boulevard Bridge
 John's Pass Bridge
 Treasure Island Causeway
 Corey Causeway
 Pinellas Bayway

References

External links

666
666